Angela Cavalieri is an Australian printmaker.

Early life and education
Cavalieri's parents migrated from Calabria, Italy, to Australia in the post-war period. She studied printmaking at the Victorian College of the Arts from 1981 to 1983.

Career
Cavalieri continued to exhibit in solo and group exhibitions since 1984.

She has been awarded several prizes and has undertaken a number of artist residencies in Europe and Australia. Her work is held in many public and private collections throughout Australia, notably Australian National Gallery, The National Gallery of Victoria,  State Library of Queensland, Baillieu Library, University of Melbourne and State Library of Victoria.  She is also represented in the Musée d'Art et d'Histoire, Geneva, Switzerland.

Art practice
Text, language and the transformative nature of culture are recurring themes in Cavalieri's art practice, referencing in particular her Italian heritage. Her work has been described as "visually seductive, monumental in their proportions and immediate in their impact" by the art historian Sasha Grishin.

She surveys the art of writing and storytelling in a visual form in a series of monumental, hand-rolled linocuts on canvas as well as producing small-scale artist's books.

Passages from Dante, Petrarch, Italo Calvino and the influences of Italian artists such as Piero della Francesca, Giotto and Piranesi are referenced in her work. The music of the Italian composer Claudio Monteverdi (1567-1643) also provided Cavalieri with inspiration, as a result of an Arts Centre Melbourne commission to produce a work about an opera in 2011, the State Library of Victoria's Creative Fellowship (2012-2013) and a residency at La Scuola Internazionale di Grafica Residency in Venice (2015), exploring the city where Monteverdi lived in the last decades of his life.

Awards and residencies 

 National Gallery of Victoria Trustee Award, 1981
 Desiderius Orban Youth Award, Australia Council, 1984
 Mitchell Endowment Acquisition Prize, National Gallery of Victoria, 1985
 Overseas Studio Grant Paretaio, Italy, Australia Council, 1986
 Project Grant, Visual Arts/Craft Board, Australia Council, 1990
 Sutherland Acquisitive Prize, Sutherland Shire Council, NSW, 1999
 Shell Fremantle Print Award, Western Australia, 1999
 Conrad Jupiter Acquisitive Prize, Gold Coast City Gallery, Queensland, 2000
 Grand Prize, The Silk Cut Print Award, 2000
 Artists-in-Schools Program Grant, Arts Victoria, 2001
 Australia Council Residency, The British School at Rome, Italy, 2003
 Dame Elisabeth Murdoch Travel Sponsorship for Academici at The British School at Rome, Italy 2005
 Edith Cowen University Residency, Perth, Wester Australia, 2005
 RMIT Summer Residency and exhibition at Project Space/Spare Room, 2007-8
 Dreams of Art Spaces Collected, Projektraum Deutscher Künstlerbund, Berlin, Germany, 2007
 Piramidon, Centre for Contemporary Art, Residency, Barcelona, Spain, 2008
 Geelong Print Prize Acquisitive Award, 2009
 Australia Council Studio Grant for Barcelona, Spain, 2010
 State Library Victoria Creative Fellowship, Melbourne, Victoria, 2012
 La Scuola Internazionale di Grafica Residency, Venice, Italy, 2015

Exhibitions

Selected solo exhibitions 
 Gertrude Contemporary (formerly 200 Gertrude Street Gallery, Fitzroy, Victoria), 1986
 Syme Dodson Gallery, Sydney, NSW, 1990
 Christine Abrahams Gallery, Melbourne, 1990
 'Recent Works', 108 Moor Street, Fitzroy, Victoria, 1996
 Smyrnios Gallery Australia, Melbourne, 1998
 Quattro Pagine, Motor Works Gallery, Melbourne, 1999
 Motor Works Gallery, Melbourne, 2001
 Città Scritta, Ovens Street Studios, Melbourne, 2004
 Scripta Manent, Artspace Mackay, Queensland, 2006
 Racconto: the Narrative and Text of Angela Cavalieri , The ICON Museum of Art, Deakin University, Burwood Campus, Melbourne, Victoria, 2007
 Passaggi Scritti, Gallery 101, Collins Street, Melbourne, Victoria, 26 February - 22 March 2007
 Chiacchierone, Australian Galleries, Smith Street, Collingwood, Victoria, 3–27 February 2011
 Canzone: Music as Storytelling, Fortyfivedownstairs, Flinders Lane, Melbourne, Victoria, 29 September - 24 October 2015
 Canzone: Music as Storytelling, Northern Centre for Contemporary Art, Darwin, Northern Territory, 9 April - 7 May 2016

Selected group exhibitions 
 National Works on Paper, Mornington Peninsula Regional Gallery, Victoria, 2004
 SMS Artists use TXT, Gold Coast City Gallery, Queensland, 2004
 Lost in Translation, Spectrum Project Space, Perth, Western Australia, 2005
 Seven Stories, Counihan Gallery, Brunswick, Victoria, 2005
 Bookscapes: exploring contemporary Australian artist's book, Port Jackson Press Print Room, Melbourne, Victoria, 2005
 Plimsoll Gallery, University of Tasmania, 2005
 The Academy Gallery, The British School at Rome, Italy, 2005
 Academici: The Australia Council Visual Arts/Crafts Board Rome Studio Residency 1999-2004, Monash University Gallery, Caulfield East, Victoria, 16 March - 13 April 2005
 Swan Hill Print & Drawing Acquisitive Awards, Swan Hill Regional Gallery, Victoria, 2006
 Art Bound: a selection of artists' books, University of Melbourne, Victoria, 23 May - 26 July 2006
 Lexicon, Gallery @ City Library, Melbourne, Victoria, 2006
 Bookish, Australian Galleries, Collingwood, Victoria, 2006
 City of Hobart Art Prize, Tasmanian Museum and Art Gallery, Tasmania, 2006
 Meeting Place, Keeping Place, George Adams Gallery, Arts Centre Melbourne, Victoria, 2006
 PROOF: Contemporary Australian Printmaking, The Ian Potter Centre, NGV Australia, Federation Square, Melbourne, 9 December 2006 - 1 April 2007
 Burnie Print Prize, Burnie Regional Gallery, Tasmania, 2007
 Works on Paper Prize, City of Banyule, Victoria, 2007
 Lessons in History Vol. 1, Grahame Galleries + Editions, Queensland, 2007
 Transitions: European Island and Regional Cultures in Late 20th & Early 21st Centuries, Macquarie University Gallery, Sydney, NSW, 2008
 Anthology: selection of works by nine Gallery 101 artists who display the diversity of their multidisciplinary individual artistic practices, Gallery 101, Collins Street, Melbourne, 3–28 June 2008
 Surveying the Field, Counihan Gallery, Brunswick, City of Moreland - selection of works by seven leading Australian artists, living or working in the arts in Moreland, 17 July - 16 August 2009

References 

Living people
Australian printmakers
Year of birth missing (living people)